Herbert Raudenbusch Amey, Jr. (February 22, 1913 – November 20, 1943) was a United States Marine Corps lieutenant colonel and Silver Star Medal recipient who served in World War II.

Early life and military career
Amey was born in Ambler, Pennsylvania. He attended Ambler High School, where he was student council president during his senior year, as well as president of his sophomore and junior classes. Thereafter, Amey attended the Pennsylvania Military College, where he was the captain of the baseball team.  Upon graduating, he became an officer in the United States Marine Corps and was initially assigned to the Marine Barracks at the Philadelphia Navy Yard.

Amey's first overseas assignment was with the 1st Battalion, 6th Marines in Shanghai, China in 1937, followed by duty at the Marine Detachment at the U.S. Embassy in Beijing.
In 1941 and 1942, he served as a captain with the 6th Marines in the 1st Provisional Marine Brigade in Iceland. As a major, Amey was battalion executive officer of the 1st Battalion, 6th Marines during its action on Guadalcanal in early 1943.

Tarawa

In 1943, first at the rank of major, then lieutenant colonel, Amey served as commanding officer of the 2nd Battalion, 2nd Marines. As such, he trained the battalion during its stay in New Zealand as part of the Second Marine Division and led the battalion ashore on D-Day of the Battle of Tarawa, November 20, 1943. Amey was killed by machine gun fire while wading ashore, just before he would have reached the beach. The shattered remnants of his battalion were temporarily commanded by Lt. Col. Irvine Jordan, before being combined with units from the 1st Battalion, 2nd Marines. For his actions that day, Amey was posthumously awarded the Silver Star Medal.

Amey was one of two lieutenant colonels killed at Tarawa, along with David Kerr Claude, an observer from the 1st Battalion, 23rd Marines. They were the highest ranking Marine Corps officers to die during the battle. Amey was temporarily interred on Betio Island at Tarawa. His remains were later transferred to the National Memorial Cemetery of the Pacific (Punchbowl), in Honolulu, Hawaii.

Silver Star citation
Citation:

The President of the United States of America takes pride in presenting the Silver Star (Posthumously) to Lieutenant Colonel Herbert R. Amey, Jr. (MCSN: 0-5099), United States Marine Corps, for conspicuous gallantry and intrepidity as Commanding Officer, Second Battalion, Second Marines, SECOND Marine Division, during action against enemy Japanese forces on Tarawa, Gilbert Islands, 20 November 1943. After completing organization of assault waves incident to landing on the well-fortified Japanese beachhead, Lieutenant Colonel Amey gallantly led his battalion forward in the face of devastating machine gun and mortar fire. When the amphibious tractor in which he was riding reached an unsurpassable coral reef, he was forced to abandon the vehicle in order to save it and led his men on through the treacherous waters. Mortally wounded by hostile machine gun fire before reaching the shore, he refused assistance and urged his command to continue without him. His brilliant leadership, great personal valor and unrelenting devotion to duty in the face of grave peril served as an inspiration to the men under his command and were in keeping with the highest traditions of the United States Naval Service. He gallantly gave his life for his country.

References

Recipients of the Silver Star
1913 births
1943 deaths
United States Marine Corps colonels
People from Ambler, Pennsylvania
United States Marine Corps personnel killed in World War II
Military personnel from Pennsylvania